Melissa Hill (born January 8, 1970) is a former pornographic actress and director. She was inducted into the AVN Hall of Fame in 2014 and XRCO Hall of Fame in 2015.

Career
Hill began her career in the adult entertainment industry in 1992 by first modeling in photo spreads in magazines such as Club, Hustler, and High Society. She proceeded to start acting in adult films a year later and appeared in more than 200 movies, for a wide variety of producers, over the next ten years until her retirement from hardcore. Over the course of her career, she was nominated for several AVN Awards. Hill won the Best Actress—Film award in 1997 for Penetrator 2 (Pleasure Productions). In 1998, she was named Best Supporting Actress—Film for Paul Thomas' Bad Wives (Vivid Entertainment). In a 2015 interview, she claimed she retired in part because she did not want to age on camera and in part because she felt her career had reached a "plateau", and she found herself not getting another contract and not wanting to succumb to plastic surgery.

Mainstream appearances
Hill has also appeared in a variety of mainstream productions, most notably the porn-themed comedy Orgazmo from South Park creators Trey Parker and Matt Stone. She has acted in non-sex roles, including Beyond Fucked: A Zombie Odyssey and the porn parodies Underworld and Measure X.

Awards
 1997 AVN Award – Best All-Girl Sex Scene, Film (Dreams of Desire)
 1997 AVN Award – Best Actress—Film (Penetrator 2: Grudge Day)
 1998 AVN Award – Best Supporting Actress—Film (Bad Wives)
 2014 AVN Hall of Fame
 2015 XRCO Hall of Fame

Personal life
Hill is a San Francisco native, and she spent most of her childhood studying ballet, even becoming an instructor for five years after graduating from high school.

References

External links

 
 
 

1970 births
American pornographic film actresses
Actresses from San Francisco
American pornographic film directors
Film directors from California
Living people
Pornographic film actors from California
Women pornographic film directors